is a Japanese voice actress from Kagoshima Prefecture who is affiliated with VIMS. She began her career in 2010 after graduating from the Japan Narration Actor Institute, and in 2014 she played her first named anime role as Haruki Sagae in Riddle Story of Devil. She is also known for her roles as Mavis von Austien in Didn't I Say to Make My Abilities Average in the Next Life?! and Horn in How Not to Summon a Demon Lord.

Filmography

Anime

2014
Riddle Story of Devil as Haruki Sagae
Wolf Girl and Black Prince as  Female student (episodes 1-2)
Brynhildr in the Darkness as Student (episode 1), Female high school student (episode 9)
Recently, My Sister is Unusual as Football club captain, Child B
Blade & Soul as Reika (episode 7)

2015
Unlimited Fafnir as Ren Miyazawa

2016
Prince of Stride: Alternative as Girl (episode 12)
Mob Psycho 100 as Yankee woman A (episode 2)

2017
Clockwork Planet as Caster
Dive!! as Reiji Maruyama (child)

2018
How Not to Summon a Demon Lord as Receptionist (episode 2), Slave A (episode 6), Servant (episode 9), Alicia's mother (episode 10), Boy (episode 12), Takuma Sakamoto (young)
Rascal Does Not Dream of Bunny Girl Senpai as Rena Kashiba

2019
Didn't I Say to Make My Abilities Average in the Next Life?! as Mavis von Austien

2021
The Hidden Dungeon Only I Can Enter as Amane
How Not to Summon a Demon Lord Omega as Horn
Tropical-Rouge! PreCure as Yumi Kuwano

2022
Komi Can't Communicate as Mikuni Katō

References

External links
Agency profile 

Living people
Japanese voice actresses
Voice actresses from Kagoshima Prefecture
Year of birth missing (living people)